Pehuajó is a city in the Pehuajó Partido (Pehuajó district) in the  province of Buenos Aires, Argentina. The name of this relatively small city is well known in Argentina because of María Elena Walsh's song Manuelita, about an adventurous turtle (tortoise); a dilapidated concrete statue of María Elena Walsh's Manuelita lies just outside the city, beside Ruta Nacional ("National Route") 5.

Climate
Pehuajó has a humid subtropical climate (Köppen climate classification Cfa). During this time of the year, overcast days are more common, averaging 8–10 days per month. Spring and fall are transition seasons featuring warm daytime temperatures and cool nighttime temperatures and are highly variable with some days reaching  and below . Summers are hot with a January high of  followed by mild nights, averaging . The average relative humidity is 75%, with the summer months being drier than the winter months. The average first date of frost is on May 22 while the last date of frost is on September 11. On average, Pehuajó receives  of precipitation per year with 83 days with measureable precipitation with summer months being more wetter than the winter months, where most of the precipitation falls in the form of thunderstorms. Pehuajó receives approximately 2,720.1 hours of sunshine per year or 60% of possible sunshine per year, ranging from a low of 41% in June (only 120.0 hours of sunshine per month) to a high of 74% in March (279.7 hours of sunshine per month).

Notes and references

External links
 
 Municipal website

Populated places in Buenos Aires Province
Populated places established in 1881
1881 establishments in Argentina
Cities in Argentina
Argentina